Battlestar Galactica is a three-hour miniseries (comprising four broadcast hours) starring Edward James Olmos and Mary McDonnell, written and produced by Ronald D. Moore and directed by Michael Rymer. It was the first part of the Battlestar Galactica remake based on the 1978 Battlestar Galactica television series, and served as a backdoor pilot for the 2004 television series. The miniseries aired originally on Sci Fi in the United States starting on December 8, 2003. The two parts of the miniseries attracted 3.9 and 4.5 million viewers, making the miniseries the third-most-watched program on Syfy.

Plot

Part 1
After a 40-year armistice in a war between the Twelve Colonies of Kobol (the homeworlds populated by humans) and the Cylons (human-created robots), the Cylons launch a surprise nuclear attack intended to exterminate the human race. Virtually all of the population of the Twelve Colonies is wiped out. Most of the Colonial military is either rendered ineffective or destroyed due to malware in the military computer network that renders it vulnerable to cyber attack. The malware was introduced by Number Six (Tricia Helfer), a Cylon in the form of a human woman, who seduced the famous scientist Dr. Gaius Baltar (James Callis) and exploited their relationship to gain access codes under the cover of an insider contract bid.

The Battlestar Galactica, a hybrid battleship/aircraft carrier in space that fought in the earlier war, is in the final stages of being decommissioned and converted to a museum when the attack occurs. During her decades of colonial service the Galactica'''s computer systems had never been networked so the Galactica is unaffected by the Cylon sabotage. Its commander, William Adama (Edward James Olmos), assumes command of the few remaining elements of the human fleet. He heads for the Ragnar Anchorage, a military armory station where the Galactica can resupply itself with weaponry and essential supplies.

Secretary of Education Laura Roslin (Mary McDonnell) is sworn in as President of the Twelve Colonies after it is confirmed that the President and most of the government have been killed (Roslin is 43rd in the line of succession). The government starship carrying her (Colonial One) manages to assemble a group of surviving civilian ships.

When a Colonial Raptor shuttle from the Galactica lands briefly for repairs on the Twelve Colonies' capital world of Caprica, the two-person crew, Sharon Valerii (callsign "Boomer") (Grace Park) and Karl C. Agathon (callsign "Helo") (Tahmoh Penikett), offer to evacuate a small group of survivors. Helo remains on the stricken planet, giving up his seat to evacuate Baltar, whom he recognizes for his celebrity status as a scientific genius.

Part 2
The Cylons locate the human civilian fleet, and Roslin is forced to make the decision to order all of the ships capable of faster-than-light (FTL) travel to jump immediately to escape. Unfortunately this means abandoning many of the survivors who are aboard ships without FTL engines and, as Roslin and the FTL ships jump away, the Cylons launch an attack on the remaining ships.

At the Ragnar Anchorage space station, Adama is attacked by a supposed arms dealer named Leoben Conoy who claims to be simply bootlegging supplies, but who is clearly being affected by the radiation cloud surrounding Ragnar, which humans are immune to. Adama deduces that he is facing a new type of Cylon that looks, sounds, and acts human.

As the civilian fleet joins the Galactica at Ragnar, President Roslin appoints Dr. Baltar, who has not disclosed his suborning by the Cylons, as one of her scientific advisers to combat the Cylons. Number Six reveals herself to Baltar in hallucinatory form while attempting to direct his behavior. She suggests that she planted a microchip inside Baltar's brain while he slept, allowing her to transmit her image into his conscious mind. Responding to one of her suggestions, he is compelled to identify Aaron Doral, a public relations specialist, as a Cylon agent masquerading as a human. Despite his protests and the lack of any evidence to support the accusation, Doral is left at Ragnar when the Galactica departs.

As the Cylons blockade Ragnar, the Galactica and its fleet of Vipers engage the Cylon fleet in order to allow the civilian fleet to escape by "jumping" to a distant, unexplored area outside of their star system. The Galactica and the colonial fleet make good their escape. Adama then attempts to lift the morale of the surviving humans by announcing plans to reach a legendary thirteenth colony called "Earth", whose existence and location have been closely guarded military secrets. Roslin is skeptical and later confronts Adama and makes him admit that Earth is simply an ancient myth.

Returning to his quarters, Adama finds an anonymous note has been left for him stating "There are only 12 Cylon models." On Ragnar, Doral clearly appears to be suffering from radiation poisoning that has been shown to affect only Cylons. His identity as a Cylon is confirmed when a group of Cylons, including the metallic Cylon Centurions and several humanoid Cylons consisting of multiple copies of the Number Six, Doral, and Leoben models, come to retrieve Doral. In a twist ending, one of the group appears to be Boomer, indicating that her counterpart on the Galactica is a Cylon as well.

Cast

Production

Development
None of the previous attempts to remake or continue the story of Battlestar Galactica by Tom DeSanto, Bryan Singer, and original series star Richard Hatch, were successful. From the mid-1990s onwards, actor Richard Hatch (Captain Apollo from the original version of the series) made numerous efforts to revive the series, including co-writing several novels and a comic book series, and even went as far as to produce a proof-of-concept trailer called The Second Coming. Hatch's campaign was based on the continuation of the original series, set several years after the final episode. DeSanto and Singer's planned version, which actually went into pre-production before being delayed and then scrapped following the events of the 9/11 terrorist attacks of 2001, was also a continuation, set some 25 years after the original series. Both versions ignored the events that occurred in Galactica 1980.

In 2002, Universal Pictures (the legal rights holder to Battlestar Galactica), instead opted for a remake rather than a sequel. David Eick approached Ronald D. Moore about a new four-hour Battlestar Galactica miniseries for Universal. Moore developed the miniseries with Eick, writing the scripts and updating the old series, also developing a backstory that could work for a regular weekly series, should the miniseries be successful. At the same time, Moore was approached by HBO about running a new television series, Carnivàle. While Moore worked on the first year of Carnivàle, Eick ran the day-to-day production of the Battlestar Galactica miniseries in Canada. Battlestar Galactica aired in 2003 and became the highest-rated miniseries on cable that year, and the best ratings that year for any show on Sci-Fi. After Carnivàle reached the end of its first season and the Sci-Fi Channel ordered a thirteen-episode weekly series of Battlestar Galactica, Moore left Carnivàle to assume a full-time executive producer role on Battlestar Galactica.

Filming
The special effects of the miniseries were created by Zoic Studios, who previously worked on the Firefly television series. In the opening minutes of Part 1, as the character of Laura Roslin sits in her doctor's office, a Firefly class ship is seen flying above the city. However, the ship does not appear in the Season 2 episode "Epiphanies" in which Roslin reflects on her wait in the doctor's office.

The regular series also contains effects by Atmosphere Studios, Enigma Animation Productions and the production's own effects team. Executive producer Ronald D. Moore said the outer space battles were created and rendered to look like a Discovery Channel crew was actually shooting footage. Filming took place in Vancouver, British Columbia.

Music

The soundtrack for the miniseries was largely scored by Richard Gibbs.

Reception
Critical response
On Rotten Tomatoes the mini series has an approval rating of 83% based on reviews from 12 critics.

Brian Lowry of Variety wrote: Battlestar Galactica takes a while to find its directional heading and build up steam, but once it does, this proves to be a surprisingly engrossing odyssey."
Ned Martel of The New York Times wrote: "The project might all be an exploitative departure from the Battlestar Galactica brand name, but it's hard not to like where the spacemen (and spacewomen) are going."
Sonia Saraiya of The A.V. Club reviewing the mini series in 2014 gave it a grade of A−.

Awards

 Wins
 2003 Visual Effects Society Awards – Outstanding Visual Effects in a Television Miniseries, Movie or a Special
 2003 Saturn Awards – Best Television Presentation

 Nominations
 2003 Visual Effects Society Awards – Outstanding Compositing in a Televised Program, Music Video or Commercial
 2003 Visual Effects Society Awards – Outstanding Models and Miniatures in a Televised Program, Music Video or Commercial
 2004 Emmy Awards – Outstanding Single-Camera Picture Editing for a Miniseries, Movie or a Special (Miniseries, Night 1)
 2004 Emmy Awards – Outstanding Sound Editing for a Miniseries, Movie or a Special (Miniseries, Night 2)
 2004 Emmy Awards – Outstanding Special Visual Effects for a Miniseries, Movie or a Special (Miniseries, Night 1)
 2003 Saturn Awards – Best Supporting Actress on Television, Katee Sackhoff

Novelization
In 2005, Tor Books published Battlestar Galactica'' (the miniseries), by Jeffrey A. Carver—a novelization of the 2003 miniseries. The book incorporates deleted scenes and gives background information not seen on screen.

Notes

References

External links

 
 
 Miniseries, Night 1 and Miniseries, Night 2 at the Battlestar Wiki

Battlestar Galactica
Television miniseries as pilots
Military science fiction television series
2003 American television series debuts
2003 American television series endings
2000s American science fiction television series
2000s American television miniseries
Television episodes written by Ronald D. Moore
Films directed by Michael Rymer
Television shows filmed in Vancouver